Pärnu Bay is a bay in the northeastern part of the Gulf of Livonia (Gulf of Riga), in southern Estonia.

Geography
It has an area of 411 km2. The maximum depth in the mouth of the bay is 12 m. The banks are low-lying, sandy in some places. The salinity of the water in the bay is 0-0,8 ppm in the spring and up to 5.5 ppm in autumn.

There are several rivers flowing into the gulf, the largest is the Pärnu River.

The bay is also Estonia's most important coastal fishing area.

References

Bays of Estonia
Gulf of Riga
Bays of the Baltic Sea
Geography of Pärnu